Anzem is a small town in Komo Department, Estuaire Province, in northwestern Gabon. The Komo River and Tchimbélé waterfall are located west of the town.

References
Maplandia World Gazetteer

Populated places in Estuaire Province
Komo Department